Sakhteman-e Hajj Parviz (also Romanized as Sākhetmān-e Ḩājj Parvīz) is a village in Dadin Rural District, Jereh and Baladeh District, Kazerun County, Fars Province, Iran. At the 2006 census, its population was 36, in 7 families.

References 

Populated places in Kazerun County